Yuxarı Kürdmahmudlu is a village and municipality in the Fuzuli District of Azerbaijan. It has a population of 1,269.

References 

Populated places in Fuzuli District